is a French phrase meaning "joy of living".

Joie de vivre may also refer to:
 Joie de vivre (album), by French singer Louane
 Joie de Vivre (di Suvero), a sculpture by Mark di Suvero in Manhattan
 Joie de Vivre (horse), a racehorse
 Joie de Vivre Hospitality, an American hospitality company

See also 
 The Joy of Living, an Italian-French film
 Joy of life (disambiguation)